The giant leaf-tail gecko (Uroplatus giganteus) is a species of lizard in the family Gekkonidae. It is endemic to Madagascar. It can reach a snout–vent length of 20 cm and a total length of 32.2 cm.

References

Uroplatus
Reptiles described in 2006